Jona is a former municipality and since January 2007 part of the municipality of Rapperswil-Jona in the Wahlkreis (constituency) of  See-Gaster in the canton of St. Gallen in Switzerland. Before the merger with Rapperswil, the former municipality of Jona comprised the villages of Jona, Bollingen, Busskirch, Curtiberg, Kempraten-Lenggis, Wagen and Wurmsbach (Wurmsbach Abbey).

Geography 

The former municipality of Jona extended from the eastern shore of the main part of Lake Zürich (Kempraten) to the northern shore of Obersee, the upper or eastern division of Lake Zurich (Bollingen, Busskirch, Wurmsbach). The former village of Jona is located on the River Jona, which flows into the Obersee.

History 
The River Jona flows through the former Jona municipality in the Obersee (upper Lake Zürich). The settlement is named after the river, first recorded in Latinized form Johanna in AD 834, as super Johannam fluvium. The Middle High German form Jonun is recorded 1243.
The river name was likely adapted into Alemannic (Old High German) around the 8th century from a Gallo-Roman *Jauna as a weakly inflecting feminine *Jōna(n), yielding modern dialectal Jōne(n).

In 1350, Rapperswil and its castle was widely destroyed by Rudolf Brun, and the Herrschaft Rapperswil – Rapperswil and some surrounding villages including Jona – was acquired by the Habsburg family.

After 1803's Act of Mediation, Rapperswil and Jona joined the canton of St. Gallen, and the former Herrschaft Rapperswil was split into the municipalities Rapperswil and Jona. Jona, as municipality, was established in 1803 around the former boundaries of the city of Rapperswil, comprising the small rest of the former Herrschaft Rapperswil and the villages of Bollingen, Busskirch, Curtiberg, Kempraten-Lenggis, Wagen and Wurmsbach.

In the early 19th century, Jona river's hydropower was used for a larger number of watermills along the small river. As a renewable source, the river was important for industrialization of the rapidly growing village.

On January 1, 2007, the municipalities of Rapperswil and Jona merged to form a new political entity: Rapperswil-Jona has a population of 25,777 (as of December 2007). This makes it the second largest town in the canton after the capital St. Gallen itself.

Transportation 

The town's bus service, Stadtbus Rapperswil-Jona, is provided by the Verkehrsbetriebe Zürichsee und Oberland (VZO) since 2008. In addition,  operates line 622 to Wagen (continues to St. Gallenkappel/Wattwil) and line 621 to Buech/St. Dyonis. 

Jona railway station and adjacent bus station were renewed between 2013 and 2015. 

Another railway station near Bollingen is disfunct since 2004.

Notable people 
 Alberich Zwyssig (1808-1854) a Cistercian monk who composed the Swiss Psalm, the present Swiss national anthem. 
 Carl Gustav Jung (1875-1961) a psychiatrist and psychoanalyst who founded analytical psychology.
 Wangpo Tethong (born 1963), Swiss-Tibetan activist, writer, spokesperson of Greenpeace Switzerland and member of the 15th Tibetan Parliament in Exile.
 Roger Federer (born 1981), Swiss former professional tennis player, is moving to Kempraten (former Jona municipality).

Gallery and maps

References

Literature 
 Eugen Halter: Geschichte der Gemeinde Jona. Politische Gemeinde Jona, Schweizer Verlagshaus, Zürich 1970.

External links 

 Rapperswil-Jona (official site) 
 
 
 
 

Former municipalities of the canton of St. Gallen
Rapperswil-Jona
Populated places on Lake Zurich